The Waco Wizards were an American ice hockey team in Waco, Texas. They played in the Western Professional Hockey League from 1996 to 2000. They played their home games in the Heart of Texas Coliseum.

Season-by-season record

Records
Games: Tim Green, 145
Goals: Jamie Dunn, 47
Assists: Jamie Hearn, 70
Points: Tony Cimellaro, 110
PIM: Chad Muachalchuk and Brad Domonsky, 314

External links
 The Internet Hockey Database

1996 establishments in Texas
2000 disestablishments in Texas
Defunct ice hockey teams in Texas
Ice hockey clubs established in 1996
Ice hockey teams in Texas
Sports clubs disestablished in 2000
Sports teams in Waco, Texas